Pneumonia is a common respiratory infection, affecting approximately 450 million people a year and occurring in all parts of the world. It is a major cause of death among all age groups, resulting in 1.4 million deaths in 2010 (7% of the world's yearly total) and 3.0 million deaths in 2016 (the 4th leading cause of death in the world).

There are various causes of pneumonia including bacteria, viruses, and fungi. Pneumonia can be acquired from different sources such as in hospitals, the community, or through use of ventilators.

Pneumonia is a type of lower respiratory tract infection, and is also the most deadly communicable disease as of 2016. Rates are greatest in children less than five and adults older than 75 years of age. It occurs about five times more frequently in the developing world versus the developed world. South Asia and Sub-Saharan Africa have the highest prevalence of pneumonia in the world.

We can prevent and treat pneumonia through vaccines, proper treatments, and healthy practices.

Hospital-acquired pneumonia 
Hospital-acquired pneumonia is pneumonia that is acquired in a hospital setting at least 48 hours after being admitted. Pneumonia is the second most common hospital-acquired disease, while also being the leading cause of death among hospital-acquired infections. Hospital-acquired pneumonia is also seen to be the cause for nearly half of all the antibiotics taken within hospitals worldwide.

A sub-type of hospital-acquired pneumonia, known as ventilator-associated pneumonia, is described as pneumonia acquired more than 48 hours after an endotracheal intubation procedure was performed. It is also seen to be the most common infection in intensive care units (ICUs), making up around 70-80% of the cases of hospital-acquired pneumonia in ICUs. The primary pathogen that can cause hospital-acquired pneumonia is dependent on the geographical location but overall, it was found that six most common bacteria that caused most hospital-acquired pneumonia cases were S. aureus, P. aeruginosa, Klebsiella species, E. coli, Acinetobacter species, and Enterobacter species. While the majority of these pathogens are bacteria, it is possible for multiple pathogens to infect at once and cause pneumonia.

Community-acquired pneumonia 
Community acquired pneumonia is the source of most pneumonia cases and is categorized as cases of pneumonia developed outside of the hospital or medical facilities. Community acquired pneumonia is one of the leading causes of hospitalization due to an infectious agent. Streptococcus pneumoniae bacteria, a type of typical agent, cause about 50% of this form of pneumonia. Respiratory viruses and atypical bacteria are also responsible for causing many cases of community acquired pneumonia. Older age, history of smoking, and having comorbidities are major risk factors for contracting community acquired pneumonia.

There is estimated to be an incidence rate of 1.5 to 14 cases of community-acquired pneumonia per 1000 person-years across the globe. Location, demographics, and seasons all affect the incidence rates of community acquired pneumonia.

Children
In 2008, pneumonia occurred in approximately 156 million children (151 million in the developing world and 5 million in the developed world). It caused 1.6 million deaths or 28–34% of all deaths in those under five years of age of which 95% occurred in the developing world. Out of all deaths of children age five and under in 2017, pneumonia was the cause of 15%, killing more children than any other infectious disease. Countries with the greatest burden of disease include:  India (43 million), China (21 million) and Pakistan (10 million).

Children in developing countries are at a significantly higher risk for developing pneumonia because malnutrition, overcrowding, and the lack of proper housing are prevalent risk factors. Other illnesses can also worsen the chances for developing pneumonia, such as malaria which is commonly seen in Africa and South Asia. Overall, the most determining risk factors for developing pneumonia among children in developing countries are age and the season. Children under 1 year of age are more at risk, and children overall are more at risk during rainy/wet seasons. S. pneumoniae appears to be the most prominent cause of infection, although it's unclear as to whether bacterial and viral co-infection plays a larger role in infecting children.

It is the leading cause of death among children in low income countries. Many of these deaths occur in the newborn period. The World Health Organization estimates that one in three newborn infant deaths are due to pneumonia. Approximately half of these cases and deaths are theoretically preventable, being caused by the bacteria for which an effective vaccine is available.

Europe
Each year, Europe suffers from 230,000 deaths caused by pneumonia. Community acquired pneumonia causes more deaths in Europe than any other single infectious agent. Community acquired pneumonia has an incidence rate of 1.7-11.6 cases per 1000 people each year in Europe. The rates of community acquired pneumonia vary by country, but there is an estimated one million people hospitalized in Europe due to this condition per year. Hospital acquired pneumonia has an incidence rate of about .05-2% and has the highest mortality rates of any infection.

United Kingdom 
In the United Kingdom, the annual incidence rate of pneumonia is approximately 6 cases per 1000 people in individuals aged 18–39 years. For those over 75 years of age, the incidence rate rises to 75 cases per 1000 people. Roughly 20–40% of individuals who contract pneumonia require hospital admission, with between 5–15% of these admitted to a critical care unit. The case fatality rate in the UK is around 5–10%.

North America

United States
In the United States, community-acquired pneumonia affects 5.6 million people per year, and ranks 6th among leading causes of death.  In 2009, there were approximately 1.86 million emergency department encounters for pneumonia in the United States.  In 2011, pneumonia was the second-most common reason for hospitalization in the U.S., with approximately 1.1 million stays—a rate of 36 stays per 10,000 population.

Pneumonia was one of the top ten most expensive conditions seen during inpatient hospitalizations in the U.S. in 2011, with an aggregate cost of nearly $10.6 billion for 1.1 million stays. In 2012, a study of Medicaid-covered and uninsured hospital stays in the United States in 2012, pneumonia was the second most common diagnosis for Medicaid-covered and uninsured hospital stays in the United States (behind mood disorders, at 3.7% for Medicaid stays and 2.4% for uninsured stays).

Africa 
Africa has the second highest incidence rate of pneumonia of children under five years old at 0.33 episodes per child per year. In 2015, pneumonia was responsible for the deaths of 473,000 African children under the age of five years old. A third of African children do not receive the antibiotics needed to treat the infection which could prevent pneumonia deaths caused by bacteria. In Sub-Saharan Africa, there is an estimated four million cases and 200,000 deaths in adult populations per year.

Asia 
Incidence rates of childhood pneumonia (under five years old) are greatest in South East Asia with 0.36 episodes per child per year. In the South East Asian region, there is an estimated 61 million cases of pneumonia in children under five per year, and it is attributed to 19% of the region's total childhood deaths. Due to the lack of surveillance in this region, an accurate prevalence rate of pneumonia can be hard to produce. There is not a reliable set of data on the incidence or death rates among adult populations in Asia.

Demographics and risk factors
More cases of community acquired pneumonia occur during the winter months than at other times of the year. Pneumonia occurs more commonly in males than in females, and more often among Blacks than Caucasians, partly due to quantitative differences in synthesizing Vitamin D after exposure to sunlight.

Individuals with underlying chronic illnesses, such as Alzheimer's disease, cystic fibrosis, emphysema, and immune system problems as well as tobacco smokers, alcoholics, and individuals who are hospitalized for any reason, are at significantly increased risk of contracting and having repeated bouts of pneumonia.

Environmental factors such as indoor air pollution, exposure to smoke, and crowded living conditions increase susceptibility to contracting pneumonia.

A retrospective time-series study performed in Hong Kong found that hospitalizations for pneumonia among children were significantly higher during and following periods of very hot or cool outdoor temperatures when compared with periods of more moderate temperatures.

Prevention and treatments 
A protect, prevent, and treat plan has been created by WHO and UNICEF as an intervention strategy for dealing with pneumonia worldwide. This intervention includes promoting breastfeeding combined with sufficient complementary feeding, vaccinations, proper hygiene/handwashing techniques, managing air pollution indoors, preventing and treating HIV, and providing adequate healthcare to treat the infection such as through antibiotics and oxygen.

References 

Pneumonia
Pneumonia